James Hartung (born June 7, 1960) is a retired American gymnast. He was born in Omaha, Nebraska.

Elite competition

Hartung was a member of the 1980 Olympic team but did not compete due to the U.S. boycott of the 1980 Summer Olympics in Moscow, Russia. As consolation, he was one of 461 athletes to receive a Congressional Gold Medal many years later. In 1984, he was a member of the gold-medal winning Olympic Team.

In 1979, Hartung was a member of the U.S. bronze-medal winning World Championships team.  He was also part of the 1978 Worlds, 1981 and 1983 Worlds squads.

At USAG national championships, Hartung won the all-around gold in 1981.  Over several years, he collected 13 golds on apparatuses. He is also considered one of the best NCAA men's gymnasts of all time as the leader of the 5-time in a row winning Nebraska team and because of his record 22 All-Americans. He was also the 1980 and 1981 NCAA all-around champion.

College competition

Hartung competed for the University of Nebraska and was a member of four straight national championship teams: 1979–1982.  He was the all-around NCAA champion in 1980 and 1981.  During his career, he also won five apparatus gold medals at NCAA championships.  In 1982, Hartung won the Nissen Award (gymnastics's "Heisman").

Post-athletic career

After gymnastics, Hartung became a high level gymnastics judge.  Since 2006, he has been an assistant coach of the men's gymnastics team at the University of Nebraska.

Hartung entered the U.S. Gymnastics Hall of Fame as a member of the gold medal Olympic team in 1984 and then in 1997 as an individual.  In 2006, he and his 1984 teammates were inducted into the U.S. Olympic Hall of Fame.  Hartung is also a member of the Nebraska High School Hall of Fame and the Omaha Sports Hall of Fame.

References

1960 births
Living people
American male artistic gymnasts
Gymnasts at the 1984 Summer Olympics
Olympic gold medalists for the United States in gymnastics
Nebraska Cornhuskers men's gymnasts
Sportspeople from Omaha, Nebraska
Medalists at the 1984 Summer Olympics
Congressional Gold Medal recipients